The following is a list of Goin' Bulilit cast members, past and present according to their batches as well as the guests. The show is broadcast by ABS-CBN.

Final casts

Remaining original batch
 Dagul (2005–2019)

Remaining 2010s batches
 CX Navarro (2013–2019) 
 Ashley Sarmiento (2013–2019; moved to Sparkle GMA Artist Center)
 Raikko Mateo (2014–2019)
 John Steven "Josh" de Guzman (2014-2019)
 Vito Quizon (2015–2019)
 Lilygem Yulores (2015–2019)
 Marco Masa (2016–2019; moved to Sparkle GMA Artist Center)
 Chun Sa Angela Jung (2015–2019)
 Cessa Moncera (2015–2019)
 Marc Santiago (2015–2019)
 Justin James "JJ" Quilantang (2017–2019)
 Angelica "Angel" Rama (2017–2019)
 Khevynne Arias (2018–2019)
 Yñigo Delen (2019)
 Jordan Lim (2019)
 Carlo Mendoza (2019)
 Freya Montierro (2019)

Former cast
Except for Dagul, the casting of the show is dedicated exclusively to children. In particular, it enforces an age limit of twelve to thirteen years of age. Casts who have grown up and go beyond the certain age will leave the show and "graduate". Before leaving, the soon-to-be graduates will have one last episode dedicated to them as a farewell gift. Present casts will sing songs while a video showing their scenes in the show is being shown. The alumni of the show will be present along with the "graduates" who will bid their goodbyes.

The "Graduates"

The following are the graduates who left the show after they graduated, or they simply graduated:

First batch (March 5, 2006)
 Alfred Labatos (Original) (2005–2006)
 EJ Jallorina (Original) (2005–2006)

Second batch (February 11, 2007)
 Carl John Barrameda (Original) (2005–2007)

Third batch (June 17, 2007)
Kiray Celis (Original)(2005–2007; moved to Sparkle GMA Artist Center)
 Kristel Fulgar (Original)(2005–2007)
 Trina "Hopia" Legaspi (Original)(2005–2007)
 Eliza Pineda (Original)(2005–2007)

Fourth batch (March 2, 2008)
 John Manalo (Original)(2005–2008)
 Julia Montes (Original)(2005–2008; moved to Cornerstone Entertainment but still with ABS-CBN)

Fifth batch (October 19, 2008)
 Kathryn Bernardo (2006–2008; still with Star Magic)
 Steven Christian Fermo (Original)(2005–2008; quit showbiz)
 CJ Navato (Original)(2005–2008; still with Star Magic)
 Jane Oineza (Original)(2005–2008; still with Star Magic)
 Mikylla Ramirez (Original)(2005–2008)

Sixth batch (October 25, 2009)
 Nikki Bagaporo (Original) (2005–2009)
 Yong An Chiu (Original) (2005-2009)
 Igi Boy Flores (Original) (2005–2009)
 Miles Ocampo (Original) (2005–2009; now a freelance artist)

Seventh batch (September 18, 2011) 
 Nash Aguas (Original) (2005-2011; still with Star Magic)
 Aaliyah Benisano (2008–2011)
 Mika dela Cruz (2006–2011; moved to Sparkle GMA Artist Center)
 Noemi Oineza (2008–2011; quit showbiz)
 Sharlene San Pedro (Original) (2005–2011; still with Star Magic)

Eighth batch (February 24, 2013) 
 Joseph Andre Garcia (2008–2013)
Alexa Ilacad (2008–2013; still with Star Magic)
 Aaron Junatas (2005–2013; quit showbiz)
 Angel Sy (2005–2013; quit showbiz)
 Kobi Vidanes (Original)(2005-2013; quit showbiz)

Ninth batch (March 23, 2014)
 Angelo Garcia (2008–2014)
 Barbie Sabino (2008-2014; quit showbiz)

Tenth batch (August 30, 2015)
 Carl Camo (2009–2015)
 Miguelito de Guzman (2009–2015)
 Belle Mariano (2012–2015; still with Star Magic)

Eleventh batch (February 28, 2016)
 Harvey Bautista (2011-2016)
 Bugoy Cariño (2009–2016)
 Brenna Garcia (2011–2016)
 Casey da Silva (2012–2016)

Twelfth batch (April 2, 2017)
 Izzy Canillo (2011–2017; now a freelance artist)

Thirteenth batch (February 25, 2018)
 Bea Basa  (2011–2018)
 Clarence Delgado (2011–2018; moved to Sparkle GMA Artist Center)
 Mitch Briones (2014–2018, graduated to Team Yey!)

Fourteenth batch (March 10, 2019)
 JB Agustin (2013-2019)
 Allyson McBride (2013–2019)
 Mutya Orquia (2012–2019)

Other former casts

The following are the other former cast members who left the show before they graduated, or they simply did not graduate:

Guests

Guest Bulilits
The following are kids or "bulilits" who have had guest appearance/s in the show at one time:

Other guests
The following is the incomplete list of teens and adults who had guest appearance/s in the show:

References

See also
Goin' Bulilit
Team Yey!

Goin Bulilit